Beşiktaş Jimnastik Kulübü, also known simply as Beşiktaş, is a Turkish sports club founded in 1903 that is based in the Beşiktaş district of Istanbul. The club's football team is one of the Big Three in Turkey and one of the most successful teams in the country, having never been relegated to a lower division. It was the first registered sports club in the country and one of the few that acquired the right to bear the Turkish flag on its crest.

Its football team has won 21 league titles including 16 Turkish Süper Lig, three Turkish National Division and two Turkish Football Championship titles. Beşiktaş is also the only team to have won the Süper Lig undefeated, in the 1991–92 campaign. The team last won the Turkish Süper Lig title and Turkish Cup during the 2020–21 season. Its home ground is Vodafone Park, a 42,590-capacity all-seater stadium located by Dolmabahçe Palace. The stadium has been considered one of the best in the world for location, design, comfort, technology, atmosphere and transportation.

The team also participates in European competitions regularly. Beşiktaş reached the quarter-finals of the 1986–87 European Cup and displayed the best Turkish team performance in the Champions League group stage by earning 14 points and progressing undefeated in the 2017–18 campaign. Beşiktaş have also reached the UEFA Europa League quarter-finals twice, in the 2002–03 and 2016–17 seasons. Based on its UEFA coefficient, Beşiktaş is currently the highest ranked Turkish team and is ranked second all-time after its rival Galatasaray.

The club's fan base, Çarşı, is well known globally. They were chosen as the best fan group in voting conducted by American sports viewers due to their 132-decibel noise record at a 2007 match against Liverpool FC. The group is involved with sociopolitical causes and is traditionally considered to be working-class and left-wing, supporting what is known as "the people's team". The highest ever football attendance in Turkish league history was recorded in a Beşiktaş-Galatasaray derby with 76,127 spectators.

The club also competes in other sports such as women's football, basketball (men's, women's and wheelchair), volleyball (men's and women's), handball, athletics, beach football, boxing, bridge, chess, gymnastics, athletics, parasports, rowing, table tennis, wrestling and esports.

History

1902–1911: Establishment of the club

Bereket Gymnastics Club was founded on 3 March 1903 under special permission from the authorities. Their sporting activities gained more freedom with the declaration of the Constitutional Monarchy in 1908. After the political events of 31 March 1909, Fuat Balkan and Mazhar Kazancı, who were in Edirne, came to Istanbul with the National Movement. After the restoration of political order, Fuat Balkan, a proven fencing coach, and Mazhar Kazancı, a wrestler and weight lifter, found the youths involved in gymnastics in Serencebey and persuaded them to train together. Refik Bey and Şerafettin Bey, friends of Fuat Bey, were also fencing practitioners. Fuat Balkan made the first floor of his own home as the club's headquarters, located in Ihlamur neighbourhood of Beşiktaş. The title of "Bereket Gymnastics Club" was renamed as "Beşiktaş Ottoman Gymnastics Club". The club was turned into a more comprehensive structure, in which gymnastics, wrestling, boxing, fencing and athletics were emphasized. Mehmet Şamil Şhaplı, one of the founding members, was elected the first president of the club.

On 13 January 1910, the club became the first registered Turkish sports club in Ottoman Empire, with the encouragement of the Governor of Beyoğlu District. The interest among the youths of the neighbourhood in the sports club grew and the number of members involved in sports quickly grew to 150. The headquarters of the club was moved from Ihlamur, Beşiktaş to Building No. 49 in Akaretler, Beşiktaş. When this building became too small, Building 84, also in Akaretler, Beşiktaş, became their headquarters. The yard behind this building was turned into a sports pitch.

Some of the young patriots from the Beşiktaş district of Istanbul formed two football clubs called "Valideçeşme" and "Basiret" under the leadership of Şeref Bey. Local football clubs "Valideçeşme" and "Basiret" joined the club, in 1911.

For years, the original colours of Beşiktaş were believed to be "Red and White"; and then temporarily changed into "Black and White", commemorating the martyrs of Balkan Wars, including players of the club. Although most written sources endorse this claim, a detailed study carried out for Beşiktaş's 100th anniversary documentary had shown that colour red was never used in club's first colours; and colours of the club were always "black and white".

1911–1959: Initial years of football

With football becoming the main sport of the Ottoman Empire around 1910, Beşiktaş members slowly started to give more attention to football. In August 1911, Ahmed Şerafettin started the football team. With the outbreak of World War I following the Balkan Wars, sporting activities at the club effectively came to a halt as many athletes left to serve on the front lines. While the end of the war allowed surviving athletes to return, the team faced a difficult period during the Occupation of Istanbul, but was able to recover with the hard work of Şeref Bey. Beşiktaş did not enter the Istanbul Friday and Sunday leagues, and did not have any championships until 1918, when they won the Istanbul Turkish 1st Sports League.

In 1921, that particular league's final season, they won it again. In 1924, Beşiktaş entered the Istanbul Football League along with Galatasaray, Fenerbahçe and other Istanbul teams. Beşiktaş became the league's first champion of 1923–24 season, but was not able to have more success in the league. Galatasaray and Fenerbahçe were the two dominant teams through the middle of the 1930s.

Beşiktaş won their 2nd Istanbul League title in 1933–34 season, as well as their first Turkish Football Championship in the same year, beating Altay in the final 3–1 on 29 October 1934. In 1937, the Turkish National League was formed. In 1936–37 Istanbul Football League season prior to the National League's inaugural season, Beşiktaş finished in fourth place, which earned them a berth in the National League. Beşiktaş finished 3rd place in the National League, behind Fenerbahçe and Galatasaray. In 1937–38 season, Beşiktaş finished in 3rd place in the Istanbul League and, 2nd place in the National League, behind Güneş. Beşiktaş won a record five consecutive Istanbul League championships between 1939 and 1943. In the National League, Beşiktaş finished 4th in 1939, 5th in 1940, 1st in 1941 and 3rd in 1943 (in 1942 the league was not held). The club won 1944–45 and 1945–46 seasons in Istanbul League, as well as the national league in 1944 and 1947.

1959–2001: From Milli Lig to Süper Lig

Professionalism in football in Turkey entered into force in 1952. In 1959, the Millî Lig was formed, the nation's first professional football league. Finishing in 2nd place at White Group and failing to reach the 2-legged-final in inaugural year of the competition, Beşiktaş won their first title in the following season. In 1960, the club also participated in the European Cup, becoming the first Turkish team ever to participate in the tournament. In subsequent years, Beşiktaş finished third in both 1961 and 1962, as well as second in 1963, 1964 and 1965. In 1966 and 1967, meanwhile, the club won back-to-back championship titles, and in the latter year, they also won their first Turkish Super Cup. In 1968, Beşiktaş finished second.

After 1967, Beşiktaş's performance declined slightly, finishing in 8th, 12th, 5th, 4th many times, while Trabzonspor, Fenerbahçe and, occasionally Galatasaray continued their success. Beşiktaş only finished in second place once in the decade, in 1973–74 season.

Following a period of 15 seasons with no league title, Beşiktaş put an end to their poor performances in 1981–82 season with a surprise championship title under the management of Yugoslav trainer Đorđe Milić, earning another in 1985–86 season. They finished the league as runners-up four times in the second half of the decade.

Hooliganism was a major problem that had started in Europe and had also spread throughout Turkey. Beşiktaş fan hooliganism had been an issue with many fights inside and outside the stadium, although this has become less of an issue in more recent years.

1987–1993: Gordon Milne era

Beşiktaş had their most successful run in the Süper Lig with three consecutive championships under the management of Gordon Milne in the early 1990s. Three players of the squad – Metin Tekin, Ali Gültiken and Feyyaz Uçar – were notable for significant contributions to the team during this period. These players were known as Metin-Ali-Feyyaz ("MAF") and they formed the front of the team's line-up. The trio is regarded by supporters as the best ever attacking line of the club. The supporters composed various chants for the trio devoted to their delighting style on the pitch, their goals, and above all for their friendship and modesty.

The only three-in-a-row title term in club history occurred in the 1989–90, 1990–91 and 1991–92 seasons. Most notably, Beşiktaş became the first and only undefeated champions in Süper Lig history.

Under Milne's management, the team adopted the 4–4–2 system. By playing down the lines, crossing and winning balls in the air, the team were in fine form and scored many goals. On 15 October 1989, Beşiktaş broke the Süper Lig record for the biggest winning margin in a game with a 10–0 victory over Adana Demirspor. This match was designated as one of the 16 biggest matches in club history. Collecting 79 points in 34 matches, Beşiktaş won the 1994–95 1. Lig with the German coach Christoph Daum with 79 points, 3 points ahead of Trabzonspor.

2001–present: Recent years

The club won the Süper Lig title in 2002–03, the centenary year of its existence, under management of Romanian coach Mircea Lucescu, Following a major squad change with 9 arrivals in summer transfer window, including the return of former players Sergen Yalçın and Serdar Topraktepe, winning all 4 Istanbul derbies, losing only 1 game in league fixtures, Beşiktaş secured the title in the penultimate round against Galatasaray with a last minute winner by Sergen Yalçın, concluding the game 1–0 at İnönü Stadium. They also reached the quarter-finals of the 2002–03 UEFA Cup. In the 2008–09 season, Beşiktaş won the league title with coach Mustafa Denizli.

Later on, Beşiktaş won the league three times in 2015–16, 2016–17 and 2020–21. In addition, they reached the 2016–17 UEFA Europa League Quarter-finals, and the 2017–18 UEFA Champions League Round of 16.

Grounds

Since the establishment of football department, Beşiktaş played at varied grounds until 1924, when they had started to play their games at Taksim Stadium, by their participation to the Istanbul Football League. İnönü Stadium used to host the football home games of Beşiktaş between 1947 and 2013 for 66 years. The first football match had been played on 23 November 1947, when Beşiktaş hosted Swedish side AIK Solna, on a friendly game, ended 3–2 in favour of away team. The club hosted their testimonial game against Gençlerbirliği in 33st match-day of 2012–13 season, ended in favour of home side 3–0, on 11 May 2013, Saturday.

Since 2016, Beşiktaş play their home games at Vodafone Park, successor of İnönü Stadium. The inaugural encounter was held between Beşiktaş and Bursaspor at week 28 of 2015–16 season, ended 3–2 as the first ever win of the hosting Beşiktaş, on 11 April 2016.

Honours

Domestic leagues

 Turkish Süper Lig
 Winners (16) 1956–57, 1957–58, 1959–60, 1965–66, 1966–67, 1981–82, 1985–86, 1989–90, 1990–91, 1991–92, 1994–95, 2002–03, 2008–09, 2015–16, 2016–17, 2020–21
 Runners-up (14): 1962–63, 1963–64, 1964–65, 1967–68, 1973–74, 1983–84, 1986–87, 1987–88, 1988–89, 1992–93, 1996–97, 1998–99, 1999–2000, 2006–07
 Turkish National Division
 Winners (3): 1941, 1944, 1947
 Runners-up (3): 1938, 1945, 1946
 Turkish Football Championship
 Winners (2): 1934, 1951
 Runners-up (2): 1941, 1946
Istanbul Football League
Winners (15): 1923–24, 1933–34, 1938–39, 1939–40, 1940–41, 1941–42, 1942–43, 1944–45, 1945–46, 1949–50, 1950–51, 1951–52, 1953–54 1-2 1-3

Domestic cups

 Turkish Cup
 Winners (10): 1974–75, 1988–89, 1989–90, 1993–94, 1997–98, 2005–06, 2006–07, 2008–09, 2010–11, 2020–21
 Runners-up (6): 1965–66, 1976–77, 1983–84, 1992–93, 1998–99, 2001–02
 Turkish Super Cup
 Winners (9): 1967, 1974, 1986, 1989, 1992, 1994, 1998, 2006, 2021
Runners-up (12): 1966, 1975, 1977, 1982, 1990, 1991, 1993, 1995, 2007, 2009, 2016, 2017
Prime Minister's Cup
Winners (6): 1944, 1947, 1974, 1977, 1988, 1997
Runners-up (2): 1987, 1996

Others

TSYD Cup
Winners (12) (shared-record): 1964–65, 1965–66, 1971–72, 1972–73, 1974–75, 1983–84, 1984–85, 1988–89, 1989–90, 1990–91, 1993–94, 1996–97
Turkish Amateur Football Championship
Winners (2): 1985, 1988
Alpen Cup
Winners (1): 2004
Efes Cup
Winners (1): 2006
Soma Tournament
Winners (1): 2014
International Royal Cup
Winners (1): 2015

European record

Statistics

UEFA club points ranking

Recent seasons

Players

Current squad

Out on loan

Other players under contract

Current coaching staff

Notable players

There are two players who served the club both as player and president, respectively Hakkı Yeten and Süleyman Seba, whom were also given title "Honorary President" by the club. Out of the two, Yeten served the club as first team manager between 1949 and 1951, as well. In cooperation with Beşiktaş Municipality, the club erected a statue of Süleyman Seba near their headquarters, in Akaretler neighbourhood of Beşiktaş, in October 2008.

Along with Yeten and Seba, there are 11 players who spent their career entirely at Beşiktaş, including 9, whose spell lasted over 10 years with over 100 appearances for the club, except Süleyman Seba and Süleyman Oktay. Hakkı Yeten, Rıza Çalımbay, Samet Aybaba, Rasim Kara and Sergen Yalçın served the club both as player and manager. Amongst these persons, Yalçın is the only one who won Süper Lig titles both as player and manager. There are also 6 players who represented their nation with over 30 caps at senior level while playing at the club, those are Rıza Çalımbay (39 caps and 1 goal between 1981 and 1992), Recep Çetin (58 caps and 1 goal between 1988 and 1997), Mehmet Özdilek (31 caps between 1990 and 1997), Tayfur Havutçu (44 caps and 6 goals between 1994 and 2004), İbrahim Üzülmez (37 caps and 1 goal 2003 and 2009) and Oğuzhan Özyakup (43 caps and 1 goal since 2013). Five out of these six players possessed the team captaincy at least for two consecutive seasons, except Özyakup.

In 2003, centennial year its foundation, the club held a survey through the validated votes from its supporters, in order to determine the "squads of century". Out or 110 players nominated, there were three eleven-man squads selected, respectively referred to as "golden", "silver" and "bronze" teams. Results of the poll were announced in a prom, held to commemorate the 100th anniversary of the club, hosted by Beşiktaş fan celebrities Çağla Kubat and Yılmaz Erdoğan, on 21 June 2003.

There are Beşiktaş players who represented their nations in top level international competitions governed by FIFA or UEFA. Former team captain Tayfur Havutçu and İlhan Mansız were part of Turkey's squad in 2002 FIFA World Cup, where they reached semi-finals. Mansız scored a golden goal in the quarter-final encounter against Senegal, advancing Turkey into semi-final against Brazil. Mansız also scored twice in 3rd place game against the hosting side South Korea. Ahmet Yıldırım and former club captain İbrahim Üzülmez competed at 2003 FIFA Confederations Cup in which Turkey finished in third place. Ricardo Quaresma was a part of Portugal winning Euro 2016, which saw the country win its first ever international title, scoring once at Round of 16 against Croatia. Domagoj Vida represented Croatia, his nation, in the final of 2018 FIFA World Cup up against France, which he lost eventually 4–2. In the final encounter, he also provided an assist to his compatriot Ivan Perišić.

Squads of century
Source:

One-club men

Coaching history

The football team was managed by Turkish and European coaches over 100 years of its existence. The first known coach of the team was Şeref Bey who managed team between 1911 and 1925. He is also the longest serving coach of the team, coaching for 14 years. The most successful coach is Gordon Milne, winning the league three times in a row along with other trophies, as well.

Presidential history

Sponsorships

Affiliated clubs
The following clubs are currently affiliated with Beşiktaş J.K.:
  Adanaspor (2015–present)
  KF 2 Korriku (2021–present)
  Kartal Bulvarspor (2022–present)

References
Notes

Citations

 Books

External links

  
 Beşiktaş J.K. at UEFA
 Beşiktaş J.K. at TFF
 Beşiktaş: Istanbul's third club but Constantinople's first at These Football Times

 
Sport in Beşiktaş
Football clubs in Istanbul
Multi-sport clubs in Turkey
Association football clubs established in 1903
1903 establishments in the Ottoman Empire
Unrelegated association football clubs
Süper Lig clubs
Sports teams in Istanbul